Coastal wattle is a common name for several plants and may refer to:

Acacia cyclops, native to Australia
Acacia sophorae, native to southeastern Australia